See:

List of Swedish Swimming Championships champions (men)
List of Swedish Swimming Championships champions (women)